Norfolk Reserve is located in suburban ,  from the centre of Sydney, Australia. An isolated bushland remnant surrounded by a heavily industrialized and urban area. Listed rare species of plants recorded in this reserve include the  downy wattle and the vine Vincetoxicum woollsii.

Geography 

Soils are relatively infertile, based on Triassic sedimentary rocks, the soil base consists of Bringelly shale. Average monthly annual maximum temperatures for nearby Bankstown range between 17.5 for July and 27.7 for January. Average monthly annual minimum temperatures range from 3 for July and 18 for February. Frosts are seldom recorded in winter. Temperatures in summer occasionally exceed 40 degrees C. Prevailing summer winds are easterly to south-easterly, winter winds are westerlies.

History 
The local indigenous Australian people were the Bidjigal group of the Darug people. Norfolk Reserve is a part of land that was acquired, by the Urban Transit Authority in 1948. A bus depot opened in 1958. The bushland was left purposely to act as a buffer between the Depot and surrounding residential areas.

Flora 
The area is a dry forest, the canopy is mostly populated by four species of eucalyptus trees, primarily Woollybutt and Broad leaf Ironbark. Grey box and Beyers Ironbark are present. Occasionally paperbarks form the canopy (Melaleuca nodosa and Melaleuca decora).

121 indigenous plants have been recorded in this small area. The forest classification is Cooks River Clay Plain Scrub Forest, listed as an endangered ecological community in 1995. Less than 1% of the original area of this community currently exists in the form of a number of small remnants such as Norfolk Reserve.

Fauna 
This small forest reserve has few indigenous vertebrate species. However, Bearded dragons and small lizards (skinks) have been recorded. Previously, the rare Regent Honeyeater (Xanthomyza phrygia) and the Bent-wing Bat (Miniopterus schreibersii) have been recorded nearby. Norfolk Reserve may provide some habitat for these species if they occur nearby today. The White-throated needletail may be seen in the skies above in summer.

Bush regeneration 
Forest conservation work is in progress. Weeds include Blackberry (Rubus fruticosus). Paddy's (Sida rhombifolia), Bidens (Bidens pilosa), Fleabane (Conyza sp.) The general health of the vegetation is fair to good. The southern part of the reserve is in particularly good condition, with few weeds.

References 

Parks in New South Wales
Forests of New South Wales
Geography of Sydney
Remnant urban bushland
Endangered Ecological Community